The Southern Cloud, registered VH-UMF, was one of five Avro 618 Ten three-engined aircraft flying daily airline services between Australian cities for Australian National Airways in the early 1930s.

Disappearance
On 21 March 1931, the Southern Cloud departed at 8:10 AM from Sydney for Melbourne. On board were six passengers and two crew, including pilot Travis "Shorty" Shortridge. Weather conditions en route were hazardous and much worse than predicted. The aircraft never reached its destination and disappeared.

The search for the missing aircraft lasted 18 days and involved over 20 aircraft. No trace of the missing aircraft was found. Airline co-owner Charles Kingsford Smith joined the search and "may have flown over the crash site, but with the aircraft having burned it would be very difficult to distinguish from the air and so the discovery wasn't made."

It was Australia's first major airline disaster. Australian National Airways folded later that year as a result of both this and another loss. A film inspired by the accident, The Secret of the Skies, was released in 1934.

Investigation and aftermath
The Southern Clouds fate remained a mystery for 27 years until 26 October 1958. On that day, Tom Sonter, a worker on the Snowy Mountains Scheme, made a chance discovery of the wreck. Investigations concluded that the severe weather conditions at the time of the flight most likely contributed to the crash.

A man named Stan Baker had been booked to fly on the fateful journey, but cancelled and travelled by train instead. As a result of the aircraft's disappearance, he harboured a lifelong fear of flying – which was proved justifiable when he was killed in the 1950 Australian National Airways Douglas DC-4 crash.

In Don Bradman's book Farewell to Cricket he mentions that he flew in Southern Cloud with pilot Shortridge from Adelaide to Melbourne, then to Goulburn not long before the tragedy. He described the trip as a 'bumpy journey'.

After the discovery of the wreckage, a large memorial incorporating salvaged parts from the plane was erected in the nearby town of Cooma. It is unclear when the pilot's name was assigned to the stream or by whom.

See also
List of solved missing person cases

References and notes

1931 disasters in Australia
1930s in New South Wales
1930s missing person cases
1931 in Australia
Airliner accidents and incidents involving controlled flight into terrain
Australian National Airways (1930) accidents and incidents
Aviation accidents and incidents in 1931
Aviation accidents and incidents in New South Wales
March 1931 events
Missing aircraft
Missing person cases in Australia